Lahan is one of the eight subdistricts (tambon) of Bang Bua Thong District, in Nonthaburi Province, Thailand. The subdistrict is bounded by (clockwise from north) Namai, Khlong Khoi, Lam Pho, Khlong Khoi, Bang Phlap, Phimon Rat, Bang Bua Thong, Sai Noi, Khlong Khwang and Rat Niyom subdistricts. In 2020 it had a total population of 24,767 people.

Administration

Central administration
The subdistrict is subdivided into 9 administrative villages (muban).

Local administration
The whole area of the subdistrict is covered by Lahan Subdistrict Administrative Organization.

References

External links
Website of Lahan Subdistrict Administrative Organization

Tambon of Nonthaburi province
Populated places in Nonthaburi province